Steinar Sagen (born 24 February 1975) is a Norwegian comedian, radio host and actor.  He is one of the presenters of Radioresepsjonen.

References

External links

1975 births
Living people
Norwegian male film actors
Norwegian male television actors
Norwegian radio presenters
Norwegian male comedians
Male actors from Oslo